John F. Hicks (born 1949, Goldsboro, North Carolina) was the American Ambassador to Eritrea (1996–1997) who resigned after a State Department investigation revealed he engaged in sexual misconduct.  Hicks also served as American Ambassador to the United Nations.

Hicks became Georgia State University’s Associate Provost for International Affairs in 1998.

Education & Career
Hicks earned a bachelor’s degree in Political Science from Morehouse College, a diploma and master’s degree from Johns Hopkins University in Bologna, Italy and Washington, D.C.

A career member of the senior foreign service, Hicks was appointed as the Assistant Administrator of the United States Agency for International Development for the African Bureau in 1993.

Sexual misconduct allegations
Hicks stepped down from his ambassadorship three weeks after Secretary of State Madeleine Albright received the Inspector General report. Based on allegations made by two Embassy employees, Hicks "violated standards for continued employment ... in that (he) clearly showed poor judgment and lack of discretion.  ... Ambassador Hicks' behavior was both severe and pervasive in creating a hostile work environment for these women.  It was unwelcomed, repeated, unsolicited and clearly of a sexual nature." Hicks claimed subordinates instigated the investigation in an attempt to ruin his career.

References

Morehouse College alumni
Paul H. Nitze School of Advanced International Studies alumni
1949 births
Ambassadors of the United States to Eritrea
Georgia State University people
Living people
20th-century American diplomats